Ravishankar Devanarayanan also known as Ravishankar is a dubbing artist in the Southern Indian film industry. He lent his voice to  Tamil industry and Hollywood actors like Robert Downey Jr. and Tom Cruise.

Career
Ravi was born in Tamil Family. His father Devanarayanan worked under actor Kamal Haasan and ravi's grandfather Kolathu Iyer lendind his voice 1943 Hindi film Ram Rajya, when it film was dubbed and released into Tamil in 1948 named as Rama Rajiyam under AVM Productions. Ravi lending his voice Baasha for Shashikumar's (he played Rajinikanth brother) and  Sangamam for actor Rahman's character. His other major work in Tamil Minnale and Padayappa lending his voice for Abbas, Aahaa..! lending voice to Rajiv Krishna. He majorly dubbed in Tamil films and gave Tamil voice to Telugu, Hindi and English dubbed films including famous - Marvel Comics Universe films as Iron Man (franchise) and Avengers (Trilogy) for Iron Man actor Robert Downey Jr. and also he lent his voice Fast and Furious (franchise) for actor Paul Walker. Initially actor Vijay Sethupathi dubbed his voice for Robert Downey Jr. as Tony Stark character for the movie Avengers: Endgame it was received several critical acclaims from audience, laterly Ravi lent his voice Tony stark.

Dubbing artist

Films

Tamil films

Tamil dubbed films

Serials

Tamil dubbed TV shows

Tamil serials

Television shows

References

Indian Tamil people
Living people
Year of birth missing (living people)
Artists from Chennai
Indian male voice actors